The Wedding Feast of Samson is a 1638 oil on canvas painting by Rembrandt. It was acquired for his collection in Dresden by Augustus II of Poland (who was also elector of Saxony as Frederick Augustus I). It first appeared in that collection's inventory in 1722-1728 and is now in the Gemäldegalerie Alte Meister.

Sources
The painting at the SKD Online Collection
Page at the Netherlands Institute for Art History

1638 paintings
Paintings by Rembrandt
Paintings depicting Samson
Food and drink paintings
Collections of the Gemäldegalerie Alte Meister